The 2018 European Korfball B-Championship was held in the Netherlands from 13 to 21 October 2018. Matches were played in Drachten, Gorredijk, Heerenveen and Leeuwarden. It was the first edition where the European Korfball Championship was split into an A-Championship and a B-Championship, with the idea that a certain number of teams will relegate from the A-Championship to the B-Championship after each edition, and a certain number of teams from the B-Championship will be promoted. Whether this will be a direct promotion or relegation, or whether play-offs will need to be played, is yet to be determined. The tournament was originally scheduled to be played by eight teams, but following a late withdrawal by Turkey, only seven teams took part.

The top two finishers qualified for the 2019 IKF World Korfball Championship.

Qualified teams

Group stage
The eight teams were divided into two groups of four, with all teams progressing to the quarter-finals. The groups were named C and D to distinguish them from Groups A and B in the 2018 IKF European Korfball A-Championship, held at the same time and location as the 2018 IKF European Korfball B-Championship.

Group C

|}

Group D

|}

Intermediate stage
Following the group stage, an intermediate round was held, featuring the group winners and the teams finishing last in the group stage of the A-Championship. The winners continued in the A-Championship knockout stage, the losers moved to or remained in the B-Championship knockout stage. As 10 nations from Europe qualify for the 2019 IKF World Korfball Championship, the winners of these matches qualified for the 2019 IKF World Korfball Championship by virtue of finishing in the top 8. The losing teams could still qualify.

Knockout stage

Main bracket

Consolation bracket
Due to the late cancellation of Turkey, only three teams were available to play for the last places. The three losing teams from the quarterfinals would play a round-robin system, playing each other once. France and Serbia were first matched against each other, with the loser playing Scotland to determine last place. The winners of the first two matches then met to determine the fifth and sixth place finisher.

Final standing

External links
Official website

European Korfball Championship
2018 in korfball
2018 in Dutch sport
International sports competitions hosted by the Netherlands
Korfball in the Netherlands